The Sovereign 7.0 is an American trailerable sailboat that was designed by Arthur Edmunds as a cruiser and first built in 1980.

The Sovereign 7.0 is a development of Edmonds' S2 7.0 design, using the same hull molds. The Sovereign 23 and Sovereign Princess 24 were also built from the same molds.

Production
The design was built by Sovereign Yachts in the United States, starting in 1980, but it is now out of production.

Design
The Sovereign 7.0 is a recreational keelboat, built predominantly of hand-laid fiberglass, with wood trim. It has a masthead sloop rig, a raked stem, a plumb transom, a transom-hung rudder controlled by a tiller and a fixed shoal-draft fin keel. It displaces  and carries  of lead ballast.

The boat is normally fitted with a small outboard motor for docking and maneuvering, although an inboard  diesel engine was a factory option.

The design has sleeping accommodation for four people, with a double "V"-berth in the bow cabin and two straight settee berths in the main cabin. The galley is located on the starboard side of the companionway ladder and is equipped with an icebox, a stainless steel sink and an optional stove. The enclosed head is located on the port side of the companionway.

For sailing the design may be equipped with a jib or a number of larger genoas.

Operational history
In a 1979 review in Cruising World, noted, "the Sovereign 7.0 Meter is a cruising sloop with a complete inventory of running gear. The hand-laid hull has a long, shoal-draft keel with lead ballast providing stiff sailing and self-righting ability. The deep freeboard gives an exceptionally dry boat and excellent sea-handling capability."

See also
List of sailing boat types

References

Keelboats
1980s sailboat type designs
Sailing yachts 
Trailer sailers
Sailboat type designs by Arthur Edmunds
Sailboat types built by Sovereign Yachts